The cobalt blue tarantula  or Cyriopagopus lividus is a species of tarantula which is in the family Theraphosidae which is native to Myanmar and over the border into Thailand. It was originally described as Haplopelma lividum.

Description
The cobalt blue tarantula is a medium-sized tarantula with a leg span around 13  cm (5 in). It is noted for its iridescent blue legs and light gray prosoma and opisthosoma, the latter of which may contain darker gray chevrons. Males and females look the same until the ultimate (final) molt of the males. At this point, the male exhibits sexual dimorphism in the form of a light tan or bronze coloration and legginess. Additionally, males gain a palpal bulb on the pedipalps and tibial apophyses (mating hooks). The female eventually becomes larger than the male and lives years longer. The cobalt blue tarantula is a fossorial species and spends nearly all of its time in deep burrows of its own construction.

Habitat
Cobalt blue tarantulas inhabit the tropical rainforests of Southeast Asia, where they construct deep burrows, and generally only leave them to find food.

Pets
The cobalt blue tarantula is a mainstay in the pet trade, despite being a fast and defensive tarantula with potent venom. Bites from this species can result in severe muscle cramps and inflammation.

References

External links

Theraphosidae
Spiders of Asia